Amsterdam is a town in Montgomery County, New York, United States.  The population was 5,566 at the 2010 census.  The town is named after Amsterdam, the capital of the Netherlands.

The town is adjacent to and borders the city of Amsterdam on three sides.  The town is on the county's northeastern border. The Erie Canal passes along the southern border of the town.

History
The region was controlled by the powerful Iroquois Confederation's member tribe, the Mohawk, prior to the entry of Europeans into the area.

The town was first settled around 1715, but most settlement did not take place until Sir William Johnson established his first seat of power in the region at Fort Johnson (earlier known as Mount Johnson), prior to founding the city of Johnstown.

The town was formed in 1793 from part of the town of Caughnawaga.

The village of Amsterdam was incorporated in 1838 in the south part of the town. As the village grew toward becoming the city of Amsterdam, it took in more territory inside the town. The town of Perth (also in Fulton County) was removed in 1838.

In 1865, the population of Amsterdam was 5,135.

The Hurricana Stock Farm and Samuel and Johanna Jones Farm are listed on the National Register of Historic Places.

Geography

The northern town line is the border of Fulton County.  The southern town boundary is defined by the Mohawk River. The eastern town line is at the border of both Saratoga County and Schenectady County.

New York State Route 5 and New York State Route 67 are east–west highways, partly conjoined near the Mohawk River. Both highways intersect north–south New York State Route 30 in the City of Amsterdam.

Demographics

As of the census of 2010, there were 5,520 people, 2,243 households, and 1,531 families residing in the town.  The population density was 196.1 people per square mile (75.7/km2).  There were 2,374 housing units at an average density of 80.0 per square mile (30.9/km2).  The racial makeup of the town was 94.77% White, 0.69% Black or African-American, 0.10% Native American, 0.24% Asian, 3.36% from other races, and 0.84% from two or more races. Hispanic or Latino of any race were 6.32% of the population.

There were 2,243 households, out of which 27.0% had children under the age of 18 living with them, 56.3% were married couples living together, 8.4% had a female householder with no husband present, and 31.7% were non-families. 27.6% of all households were made up of individuals, and 12.7% had someone living alone who was 65 years of age or older.  The average household size was 2.41 and the average family size was 2.91.

In the town, the population was spread out, with 20.2% under the age of 18, 6.2% from 18 to 24, 24.4% from 25 to 44, 26.3% from 45 to 64, and 22.9% who were 65 years of age or older.  The median age was 44 years. For every 100 females, there were 91.0 males.  For every 100 females age 18 and over, there were 85.5 males.

The median income for a household in the town was $37,097, and the median income for a family was $46,667. Males had a median income of $34,476 versus $23,533 for females. The per capita income for the town was $19,099.  About 5.1% of families and 7.0% of the population were below the poverty line, including 4.8% of those under age 18 and 8.6% of those age 65 or over.

Communities and locations
Chuctenunda Creek – A tributary of the Mohawk River, flowing through Amsterdam city.
Church Corners – A hamlet near the western town line on NY-67.
Cranesville – A hamlet east of Amsterdam city on NY-5 by the Mohawk River.  The community is named after early settler David Crane.
Crescent Park – A hamlet northeast of Amsterdam city.
Evas Kill – A stream emptying into the Mohawk River, named after Evas van Alstyne, killed by natives in that location.
Fort Johnson – The Village of Fort Johnson is located west of Amsterdam city on NY-5.
Hagaman –  The Village of Hagaman is northeast of Amsterdam city and was formerly called "Hagamans Mills" and located on the Chuctenunda Creek.
Harrower – A hamlet northeast of Amsterdam city.
Harrower Pond – A wide part of the Chuctanunda Creek.
Manny Corners – A hamlet northeast of Amsterdam city.

Rockton – A hamlet on the northern edge of Amsterdam city.
Tribes Hill – A hamlet at the western town line on NY-5 and former meeting place of the local natives.
Wallins Corners – A hamlet north of the City of Amsterdam.

References

External links
 Town Of Amsterdam
  Early historical information on Amsterdam

Towns in Montgomery County, New York
Populated places on the Mohawk River